Lộc Bình is a rural district of Lạng Sơn province in the Northeast region of Vietnam. In 2003, the district had a population of 80,517. The district covers an area of 998 km². The district capital is Na Dương.

Administrative divisions

| width="10%" align="left" valign="top" style="border:0"|
 Lộc Bình
 Na Dương
 Ái Quốc
 Xuân Dương
 Hữu Lân
 Nam Quan
 Minh Phát
 Đông Quan
 Hiệp Hạ
 Xuân Tình
| width="10%" align="left" valign="top" style="border:0"|
 Như Khuê
 Nhượng Bạn
 Quan Bản
 Lục Thôn
 Vân Mộng
 Bằng Khánh
 Xuân Lễ
 Xuân Mãn
 Đồng Bục
 Hữu Khánh
| width="10%" align="left" valign="top" style="border:0"|
 Mẫu Sơn
 Yên Khoái
 Tú Mịch
 Tú Đoạn
 Khuất Xá
 Tam Gia
 Tĩnh Bắc
 Sàn Viên
 Lợi Bác

References

Districts of Lạng Sơn province
Lạng Sơn province